Gin Drinkers Bay or Gin Drinker's Bay, also colloquially known as Lap Sap Wan, was a bay in Kwai Chung, Hong Kong.

The bay was reclaimed in the 1960s and became Kwai Fong and part of Kwai Hing. At the mouth of the bay stood the island of Pillar Island.

The bay was a harbour for Tanka fishing junks. They relocated to Tsing Yi Tong and Mun Tsai Tong of Tsing Yi Island before the commencement of reclamation.

Lap Sap (垃圾) means "rubbish" in Cantonese. It is unclear why the bay was named "rubbish" in the past. However, it was coincidentally once a dumping area for rubbish after extensive reclamation. It is assumed that in Gin Drinkers Bay Park or Kwai Chung Park near Pillar Island that the area is subject to landfill gas produced deep in the ground even though it is covered with earthen hills. It remains closed due to unsafe levels of landfill gas.

Gin Drinkers Bay is known for the Gin Drinkers Line, which formed a defensive line against the Japanese invasion in 1941.

See also
 Kwai Chung Incineration Plant
 Waste management in Hong Kong

References

Kwai Chung
Bays of Hong Kong
Ports and harbours of Hong Kong
Waste management in Hong Kong